Rajaram Ramji Bhole was an Indian politician, elected to the Lok Sabha, the lower house of the Parliament of India as a member of the Indian National Congress.

References

External links
Official biographical sketch in Parliament of India website

India MPs 1967–1970
Lok Sabha members from Maharashtra
Indian National Congress politicians
1913 births
Year of death missing